Annapurna Rural Municipality may refer to:
Annapurna Rural Municipality, Kaski, a rural municipality in Kaski District of Nepal
Annapurna Rural Municipality, Myagdi, a rural municipality in Myagdi District of Nepal